The National Economic Council is a Cabinet committee in the UK Government created in 2008, replacing the Economic Development Committee.

References

External links 

 Press release on number 10 website
 National Economic Council webpage on the Cabinet Office website

Committees of the United Kingdom Cabinet Office
2008 establishments in the United Kingdom